Lutfor Rahman is a Bangladesh Awami League politician and the former Member of Parliament of Gaibandha-2.

Career
Rahman was elected to parliament from Rangpur-19 as a Bangladesh Awami League candidate in 1973. He was elected to parliament from Rangpur-20 as a Bangladesh Awami League candidate in 1979. He was elected to parliament from Gaibandha-2 as a Bangladesh Awami League candidate in 2001.

Death
Rahman died on 22 February 2008 in Labaid Hospital.

References

Awami League politicians
2008 deaths
8th Jatiya Sangsad members
1st Jatiya Sangsad members
2nd Jatiya Sangsad members